Graptostethus servus is a species of seed bug in the family Lygaeidae. It is found in Europe, Asia, Australia, and in the Pacific region.

Subspecies
These six subspecies belong to the species Graptostethus servus:
 Graptostethus servus conjunctus Stichel, 1958
 Graptostethus servus insularis Stichel, 1958
 Graptostethus servus maculicollis (Herrich-Schaeffer, 1850)
 Graptostethus servus pacificus Stichel, 1958
 Graptostethus servus servus (Fabricius, 1787)
 Graptostethus servus stali Stichel, 1958

References

External links

 

Lygaeidae